Shahid Yousuf (born 15 June 1986) is a Pakistani cricketer for Lahore. A right-hand bat, Yousuf made his debut in 2002.  In 2003, he was named vice-captain for the Pakistan U-19 team which toured Sri Lanka.

In April 2018, he was named in Punjab's squad for the 2018 Pakistan Cup.

References

External links
 

1986 births
Living people
Cricketers from Sialkot
Sialkot cricketers
Zarai Taraqiati Bank Limited cricketers
National Bank of Pakistan cricketers
Sialkot Stallions cricketers
Water and Power Development Authority cricketers
Pakistani cricketers
Peshawar Zalmi cricketers
ICL Pakistan XI cricketers
Lahore Badshahs cricketers
Murray College alumni
Badureliya Sports Club cricketers